This is the results breakdown of the local elections held in Castilla–La Mancha on 13 June 1999. The following tables show detailed results in the autonomous community's most populous municipalities, sorted alphabetically.

Overall

City control
The following table lists party control in the most populous municipalities, including provincial capitals (shown in bold). Gains for a party are displayed with the cell's background shaded in that party's colour.

Municipalities

Albacete
Population: 145,454

Ciudad Real
Population: 61,138

Cuenca
Population: 44,558

Guadalajara
Population: 64,439

Talavera de la Reina
Population: 72,208

Toledo
Population: 66,989

See also
1999 Castilian-Manchegan regional election

References

Castilla-La Mancha
1999